This is a list of the songs that reached number one in Argentina between 1973 and 1980, according to Billboard magazine with data provided by Rubén Machado's "Escalera a la fama".

1973

1974

1975

1976

1977

1978

1980

See also
1973 in music
1974 in music
1975 in music
1976 in music
1977 in music
1978 in music
1980 in music

References

Sources
Print editions of the Billboard magazine.

1970s in Argentina
1980 in Argentina
Argentina
Argentina
1973